USS Myrmidon (ARL-16) was laid down as a United States Navy  but converted to one of 39 s that were used for repairing landing craft during World War II. Named for the Myrmidons (in Greek mythology, warriors of the fierce Thessalian tribe who accompanied King Achilles, their leader, to the Trojan War), she was the only US Naval vessel to bear the name.

Construction
Laid down as LST-948 on 25 August 1944, at Hingham, Massachusetts, by the Bethlehem Hingham Shipyard; named Myrmidon 11 September 1944; launched 28 September 1944; sponsored by Mrs. Marguerite Ross; placed in reduced commission 19 October 1944; transferred to Jacksonville, Florida; decommissioned there 10 November 1944; converted to ARL-16 by Merrill Stevens Shipyard, Jacksonville; and commissioned 9 March 1945.

Service history
After shakedown along the east coast, Myrmidon departed Norfolk, Virginia, for the Pacific on 10 April. She reached San Diego, late in the month; then, after loading cargo at San Francisco, she steamed to Pearl Harbor, on 19 May, for duty with Amphibious Force, Pacific Fleet. Sailing in convoy 30 May, she steamed via the Marshall Islands to Iwo Jima, where she arrived 22 June.

During the closing weeks of fighting in the Pacific Myrmidon operated at Iwo Jima, repairing, disbursing, and provisioning ships at that important American forward base. Following the Japanese surrender, she continued service and repair duties throughout the Pacific from the Marianas to Pearl Harbor.

Late in 1946 she returned to the Gulf coast and was placed in a reduced service status in January 1947. She decommissioned at Orange, Texas, 7 July 1947, and entered the Atlantic Reserve Fleet. She remained berthed with ships of the Orange Group for more than a decade. Her name was struck from the Naval Vessel Register 1 April 1960, and she was sold 21 December 1960, to River Equipment, Inc., of Memphis, Tennessee, and later resold to the Dravo Corporation, Neville Island, Pittsburgh, Pennsylvania, 16 January 1961. Resold to the Avondale Shipbuilding Corporation  1962, her final fate is unknown.

Notes

Citations

Bibliography 

Online resources

External links
 

 

Achelous-class repair ships
Achelous-class repair ships converted from LST-542-class ships
World War II auxiliary ships of the United States
Ships built in Hingham, Massachusetts
1944 ships
Atlantic Reserve Fleet, Texas Group